The Haukar men's basketball team, commonly known as Haukar, is the men's basketball department of Knattspyrnufélagið Haukar multi-sport club, based in the town of Hafnarfjörður, Iceland.

Home court
Haukar play their home games in Ólafssalur (English: Ólaf's hall) in Ásvellir. The court is named after Ólafur Rafnsson, a former Haukar player and president of FIBA Europe.

Recent history
Haukar where relegate from the top-tier Úrvalsdeild karla at the end of the 2020-2021 season. In March 2022, Haukar secured victory in the second-tier 1. deild and promotion back to the Úrvalsdeild.

Honors
Úrvalsdeild karla
 Winners (1): 1988

Icelandic Basketball Cup
 Winners (3): 1985, 1986, 1996

Division I
 Winners (3): 1983, 2013, 2022

Division II
 Winners (1): 1981

Notable players

Coaches

References

External links
Team profile at eurobasket.com

Haukar (basketball)
Hafnarfjörður